An underground city is a series of linked subterranean spaces that may provide a defensive refuge; a place for living, working or shopping; a transit system; mausolea; wine or storage cellars; cisterns or drainage channels; or several of these. Underground cities may be currently active modern creations or they may be historic including ancient sites, some of which may be all or partially open to the public.

The term may also refer to a network of tunnels that connects buildings beneath street level that may house office blocks, shopping malls, metro stations, theatres, and other attractions. These passages can usually be accessed through the public space of any of the buildings connecting to them, and sometimes have separate entries as well. This latter definition encompasses many modern structures, whereas the former more generally covers tunnel systems from ancient times to the present day.

Underground cities are especially functional in cities with very cold or hot climates, because they permit activities to be comfortably accessible year round without regard to the weather. Underground cities are similar in nature to skyway systems and may include some buildings linked by skyways or above-ground corridors rather than underground.

Some cities also have tunnels that have been abandoned.

Argentina
Buenos Aires, capital of Argentina, has an extensive number of underground cities in its Subte. Most stations have small shops, bars and kiosks, while main hubs interconnect through underground pedestrian walkways with railroad stations, governmental buildings, or shopping centres. Some have additional mall-like mezzanine levels, with the Centro Obelisk of Buenos Aires area (three lines, four underground levels), Estación Retiro, Estación Constitución, Estación Once, and Federico Lacroze railway station being the most important ones.

Australia
Sydney has a series of underground shopping malls around the Town Hall underground station. The tunnels run south to the George Street cinema district, west under the town hall, and north to Pitt Street Mall through the Queen Victoria Building. The northern branch links Queen Victoria Building with Galleries Victoria, Sydney Central Plaza (which in turn links underground to Westfield Sydney and internally above ground to Centrepoint, Imperial Arcade, Skygarden, Glasshouse and 25 Martin Place). In 2005, Westfield Corporation submitted a development application to link Sydney Central Plaza underground with 3 other properties on Pitt Street Mall and extend the tunnel network by a further  or more.

Perth has a small network of underground shopping malls running from the St Georges Terrace entrance to Trinity Arcade to Murray Street Mall.

The small town of Coober Pedy in northern South Australia has numerous underground residences and other facilities. The area was and is extensively mined for opal, and the settlers lived underground to escape the scorching daytime heat, often exceeding .

Bosnia and Herzegovina 

 Skenderija is a cultural, sports and trade center located in Sarajevo, Bosnia and Herzegovina. In the area of 70,000 square meters there are multipurpose halls for various sports, concert and cultural venues, and trade areas above ground including square. Underground is a modern shopping center "Privredni grad" (English: Commercial City) with numerous confectionery shops, restaurants, coffee bars and other spaces.
 The Sarajevo Tunnel (Serbo-Croatian: Sarajevski tunel / Сарајевски тунел), also known as Tunel spasa (Тунел спаса, English: Tunnel of salvation) and Tunnel of Hope, was a tunnel constructed between March and June 1993 during the Siege of Sarajevo in the midst of the Bosnian War.

Canada

The cold-winter northern continental climate of much of Canada makes underground pedestrian malls particularly useful in many cities.

Edmonton, Alberta, has a small system of tunnels and above-ground skyways called the Pedway connecting buildings and LRT stations of the downtown core.
Halifax, Nova Scotia (Downtown Halifax Link), where no point is more than 10 minutes casual walking distance from any other one.
Montreal, Quebec, Underground city, or la ville souterraine in French, is the largest underground network in the world. Its  of tunnel cover more than 41 city blocks (about ). Access through the RÉSO can be made to apartment buildings, hotels, offices, banks, and universities, as well as public spaces like retail shops and malls, concert halls, cinemas, the Bell Centre hockey arena, museums, seven metro stations, two train stations (Lucien-L'Allier and Gare Centrale), a bus terminal (Réseau de transport de Longueuil and other transit authorities), and other areas. It connects 80% of office space and 35% of commercial space in downtown Montreal.
The network began as a connection between Place Ville Marie, the Queen Elizabeth Hotel and the Gare Centrale.
More than 2,000 shops and 40 cinemas line the passageways. Tourists often visit attractions in the underground city, which is used by an average of half a million Montrealers per day.
Eight metro stations link to smaller networks that are not yet part of the central network, such as Berri UQAM in the eastern part of downtown and Pie-IX which links venues from the 1976 Summer Olympics.
Carleton University in Ottawa, Ontario, has a  tunnel network which connects ten residence buildings with other buildings on its main campus. There are plans to expand the underground network after the Confederation Line, a rapid transit line featuring three downtown subway stations, is completed. It is estimated there will be as many as 20 buildings with direct indoor connections to the downtown subway portion, or 4 million square feet of office space,   of retail, 1400 hotel rooms and the Ottawa Convention Centre.
Saskatoon, Saskatchewan – On the campus of the University of Saskatchewan a tunnel system connects several of the buildings on campus, this is augmented with overhead walkways that further extend the network.
St. John's, Newfoundland and Labrador – At the main campus of Memorial University of Newfoundland are the MUNnels, a tunnel system, in which all the main buildings are connected, though there are also some elevated walkways.
Toronto, Ontario ("PATH"), comprises  of walkways and 1,200 shops. It links many important buildings and attractions downtown to six TTC subway stations. PATH accommodates 100,000 pedestrians daily, and PATH businesses host the world's largest underground sidewalk sale once annually.
Toronto also has a separate, smaller "underground city" connecting several building complexes and two subway stations on Bloor Street.
Vancouver, British Columbia, has two shopping malls, Pacific Centre and Vancouver Centre, that are interconnected and extend over three city blocks, containing more than 200 stores that weaves above and below ground level. These malls have metro access at Granville SkyTrain Station on the Expo Line and Vancouver City Centre SkyTrain Station on the Canada Line. There are also restricted tunnels and parking garage connections connecting the Pacific Centre structure to Robson Square and the Courthouse building.  Other connections exist between SkyTrain stations and surrounding buildings such is the case with the Burrard Station connections to the Bentall Centre and the Royal Centre and Waterfront Station's links with Canada Place and the Sinclair Centre.
Winnipeg, Manitoba, has a smaller (mainly commercial office) area located underground in the downtown core below Portage and Main. Several of the downtown office towers have subterranean entrances to the complex allowing employees and visitors to bypass the downtown traffic and avoid the cold winter temperatures Winnipeg regularly experiences. The system links with the skyway system known as the Winnipeg Walkway. Also the University of Manitoba has tunnels for the students to travel from building to building.
Charlottetown, Prince Edward Island, has a tiny system. A pedestrian tunnel connects the Confederation Center of the Arts with the Confederation Court Mall. The mall also connects to The Holman Grand Hotel. The Mall is separated into a main section and a much smaller section connected by an overground walkway. This small section of the mall connects to a 338 spot parking garage, which itself connects to the Homburg Financial Building, and has a separate public entry. Apart from the hotel, two additional office buildings are on top and can be assessed through the mall, a building owned by National Bank, and a building owned by BDC.

Chile
Santiago has some elements of an underground city in its "Metro" subway system. While all stations have a small mezzanine level above the tracks for ticket purchase, some key stations have extensive areas of shops and kiosks in addition. Some stations even have an additional mall-like level between the street and the mezzanine levels.

China
Beijing built an extensive tunnel network called the Underground City during the Sino-Soviet conflict, supposedly covering 85 km2, falling into disuse in the 1970s. It was opened in 2000 to the public and tourists, but closed in 2008 for renovations. , all "official" remaining entrances appear to be closed.
Guangzhou has at least 16 different underground networks. 
The largest underground network being the one in Zhujiang New Town connecting the commercial basements of over 35 office towers and malls surrounding the Zhujiang New Town Central Park and extends to Zhujiang New Town, Guangzhou Women and Children's Medical Center, Huangpu Dadao and Huacheng Dadao metro stations. The mall portion under the Zhujiang New Town Central Park alone totals at least  of commercial space. 
In addition there are large subterranean retail tunnels that surround several Guangzhou Metro stations such as Tiyu Xilu, Tianhe Sports Center, Martyrs' Park, Guangzhou railway station and Guangzhou East railway station.
Smaller networks of subterranean retail tunnels surround several Guangzhou Metro stations such as Chen Clan Academy, Jiangnan West (江南新地商业街), Gongyuanqian
Harbin has a number of large, multi-level underground shopping areas, originally built for air defense. The largest is at the roundabout intersection of Xida Zhi street and Hongjun street where three levels of markets following streets from four directions meet under the giant snowflake atrium.
Hangzhou has an underground mall in Wulin Square connected to a subway station of the same name and nearby office buildings.
Nanjing has an underground mall around Xinjiekou metro station.
Qingdao has two small underground shopping areas, one at the head of the Zhanqiao (pier) and one west of the Qingdao guest house.
Shanghai has a few underground networks, most notably at People's Square metro station, wherein the line 2 station has a second mezzanine full of shops and Line 1 is connected to a large underground shopping gallery at its south end. Shanghai Science Museum stop on line 2 has a large underground shopping area, known for its imitation goods. Huangpi Road South and Xujiahui stations are directly connected to shopping centers, and the Lujiazui station is connected to the Bank of China tower.
Shenzhen has quite a few underground shopping malls:
Link City, an underground shopping plaza connecting Convention and Exhibition Center, Shopping Park, Futian and Gangxia stations with surrounding office buildings. The initial sections of the mall used to be an air-raid shelter. It is currently being expanded to Gangxia North station.
An underground electronics market connecting Huaqiang Road, Huaqiang North and Huaxin stations and the surrounding Huaqiangbei electronics markets.
Smaller networks of subterranean retail tunnels surround several Shenzhen Metro stations such as Chegongmiao, Laojie, Science Museum, Luohu, Huangbeiling, and Window of the World.
Wuhan has a number of subterranean retail tunnels surrounding Wuhan Metro stations such as Zhongshan Park, Wuhan Business District, Wangjiawan, Qushuilou, Xudong, Wangjiadun, Hongshan Square and Changgang Road Stations.

Croatia 

 Cellars of Diocletian's Palace, sometimes referred to as the "basement halls", is a set of substructures, located at the southern end of Diocletian's Palace (now the southernmost part of Split Stari grade), that once held up the private apartments of Emperor Diocletian and represent one of the best preserved ancient complexes of their kind in the world.

Finland

In Helsinki centre, underground shopping areas cover the central railway station area including the underground shopping centre Asematunneli, and two subway stations, Rautatientori and Kamppi. The Kamppi metro station is integrated with the Kamppi Center long-distance bus terminal, freight depot and internal parking area, all underground. It features a six-storey shopping complex and a central bus terminal for local buses. Together with these, the Forum shopping centre, Sokos and Stockmann department stores are all connected together with underground walkways featuring shops and other services.
Three other subway stations in Helsinki have similar, smaller undergrounds: Hakaniemi, Sörnäinen and University of Helsinki.
The master plan of Helsinki's large underground city complex is known to be the only one of its kind in the world.

France
Paris:
Other parts of the tunnel network have long been closed off for safety reasons, but the tunnels have served as safe passageways during war and revolution, routes for urban explorers, and venues for unauthorized cultural activities.
La Défense, the major business district northwest of the city center built in the 1960s, has an extensive network of commercial passageways under a vast plaza centered on the Gare de La Défense and radiating out to connect with surrounding buildings, notably the large Les Quatre Temps shopping center and CNIT, but enabling access to many buildings of the district.
The Forum des Halles is a partially underground multilevel commercial and shopping center connected to the massive underground transit hub Chatelet-Les-Halles. Opened in 1979, passageways extend west under the Jardin Nelson Mandela for several city blocks, and within the fare zone of the Paris Metro, stretch half a kilometer south to the banks of the River Seine.
Occupied by the Triple Entente forces during WWI, and then used as headquarters by the German Army during the WWII occupation of France, the galleries are now open to visitors.
Arras: During World War I, the French and British Army built a tunnel system (boves) based upon the already existing adits from a formerly used quarry. Scots and Englishmen used the quarry below the quarter Saint-Sauveur and called it "Glasgow", "Manchester" and "Liverpool". The New Zealand Army (bonded with the British Army) used the quarry for constructing another tunnel system below the quarter Ronville and called it "Wellington", "Auckland" and "Nelson". Soldiers from these armed forces hid in the tunnels for several days. On April 9, 1917, 5:30 am, 24,000 soldiers sortied from there to encounter German troops.

Germany
Berlin: Several buildings on the east side of Friedrichstraße, from Quartier 205 (Friedrichstraße 70) northwards up to Galerie Lafayette are connected to each other. Businesses are on both sides of the underground street so that it appears to be inside a building all the time, even when it crosses Taubenstraße underground.

Extensive underground bunkers still exist all throughout the city centre, although they are largely sealed off and closed to the public.

All of the buildings at the large Charité Virchow campus are connected via a system of spacious tunnels. In addition to employee use, particularly during inclement weather, there is also a rudimentary robotic system via which mail and packages are delivered across campus.

Frankfurt am Main: Underground shopping malls, called 'B-Ebene' in Frankfurt, of considerable size are found at Hauptbahnhof (central station) and Hauptwache.
Hamburg: The Jungfernstieg and Rathaus subway stations and several entrances are connected by pedestrian tunnels, some of them contain shops. There is a direct access to the Europapassage shopping mall.
Munich: Underground shopping mall at Karlsplatz/Stachus. This combines the underpass that leads to the pedestrian area and the entry to the subway system.
Stuttgart: There is a large underground shopping mall (Klettpassage) connecting the Hauptbahnhof (central station) with the main shopping street, the Königstraße.

Greece
In Thessaloniki, Hellenistic, Roman, Byzantine, and Ottoman monuments coexist underground and several of these have been discovered and emerged. Monuments such as the Catacombs of St. John and the underground museum of the Agora have limited access and many are not permitted to enter even to the locals by the Archaeological Department of the Thessaloniki underground Metro project.

Hong Kong
Many MTR stations in Hong Kong form extended underground networks connecting to buildings and at the basement of some major shopping malls in the area above. The stations themselves house a number of retail shops. Notable examples are the Central–Hong Kong stations and the Tsim Sha Tsui–East Tsim Sha Tsui stations. Only rarely are there not any shops. Additional underground networks have been proposed for Causeway Bay in 2006 and in Kwun Tong under Hoi Yuen Road in 2010. , studies are underway for underground networks in Tsim Sha Tsui, Kowloon Park, Victoria Park, Causeway Bay, Happy Valley, Admiralty, Wan Chai and Hong Kong Park. In 2017, The Development Bureau announced that two underground streets will be constructed, which would connect San Po Kong, Kai Tak station and Sung Wong Toi station.

Iran
Historical underground cities of Persia include Samen, Nushabad, and Kariz.

Kish: An underground city by the name of Hidden Pearl was constructed of roads interlinked 20 meters (66 ft.) under the ground. Shops and restaurants are planned to be built.
Tehran: Tehran has made a series of underground pathways in and around Vali-e Asr Metro Station and is in planning stage to increase commercial activity in newly built buildings in the central part of the city. The priorities for future development are expansion of underground connections around Haft-e Tir Metro Station and Meydan-e Vali-e Asr Metro Station.
Isfahan: With the completion of Imam Hosein Metro Station, and Jahan Nama Complex, and their eventual underground connection, there would be an underground complex of a length of 300 m formed in Isfahan downtown area. Also, not underground per se, with Imam Ali Square's street network being dug underground and a large open space plaza being constructed on the top, the plaza is connected through a series of covered bazaar pathways of a length exceeding 4 km, connecting it to Naqsh-e Jahan Square.
Nushabad: Nushabad has an underground city that served as a refuge during wars.

Italy
Ancient Rome had a network of catacombs, ancient Jewish and Christian underground burial places near the city.
Naples has many chambers and tunnels beneath the city, including channels and reservoirs for water, and catacombs.

Japan

Osaka has enormous underground networks in the Umeda, Namba, and Shinsaibashi districts, in which Umeda alone includes over 1,200 retail stores and restaurants, as well as subway and intercity rail stations.
Tokyo has numerous networks of connecting passages surrounding subway stations that span a few blocks for commuters. Stations such as Shinjuku and Shibuya have underground shopping malls. Shinjuku in particular has a reputation for being so large and complex that even local Japanese get lost there. The top five largest underground "cities" (地下街, chikagai) in Japan are all shopping districts:
Crysta Nagahori in Chūō-ku, Osaka – 
Yaesu Chikagai in Chūō, Tokyo – 
Kawasaki Azalea in Kawasaki-ku, Kawasaki – 
Central Park Chikagai in Naka-ku, Nagoya – 
Diamor Osaka in Kita-ku, Osaka –

Jordan
Jordan boasts the city of Petra—"rose-red city, half as old as time"—carved from the living rock.

Mexico
Guanajuato city was built over old silver mines, some of which are used as roads. The Mexico DF metro system has many underground pedestrian walkways connecting stations.

Netherlands
In general, many large railway stations house underground hallways featuring shops, restaurants, banks and money exchange offices. A striking example of such stations would be the main hallway of the Amsterdam central station, which connects to the city's metro system, although due to renovation and re-building it was temporarily (2012–2015) not possible to walk from the subway to the train station without going outside.

This tunnel network has mainly been used for military purposes. The main construction period of these tunnels lasted from 1575 to 1825. The newest sections of the tunnel network were dug as late as the middle 20th century, built in the Cold War as a shelter for citizens in the event of a nuclear strike on the city. 
These man-made 'caves' were used as Marl quarries from the 13th century onwards. In World War II, these caves were used to hide large quantities of paintings from the Germans, even including the Nachtwacht. In 1944, construction started on a large public shelter that could have housed 45,000 persons in these caves. The project never saw its completion due to the liberation of Maastricht in the fall of the same year.

Poland
Warsaw: Warszawa Centralna railway station is connected by pedestrian tunnels to adjacent rail stations Warszawa Śródmieście and Warszawa WKD, Złote Tarasy shopping center, and the Centrum LIM skyscraper.

Russia
Moscow: "Okhotnyi Ryad" (Охотный Ряд) four-level underground shopping mall linked to Metro station of same name.
Moscow Metro 2 is a purported secret underground metro system in Moscow built supposedly during (or from) the time of Joseph Stalin.

Singapore
Extensive underground networks exist around most major stations of the Mass Rapid Transit, such as the one at the Raffles Place MRT station with direct underground connections to 19 buildings in the busy Raffles Place area. Expanding the network is the first phase of a new subterranean network linking the station to the One Raffles Quay and Marina Bay Financial Centre for a complex underground pedestrian network across the entire downtown area. 
It is also linked to the Esplanade MRT station on the Circle MRT line.
The Orchard Road shopping belt is connected by underground linkways often with commercial space, particularly around the three MRT stations serving the district, namely Orchard, Somerset and Dhoby Ghaut. Plans are also in place to link towards Bras Basah Road into Suntec City, Bugis Junction and Chinatown.

South Korea
Seoul has a well-developed underground network. Myeongdong and Hoehyeon underground streets are the most famous; they are connected to Hoehyeon Station and Myeongdong Station
It is planned to build a larger underground city in Gangnamdaero, the border between Gangnam District and Seocho District.

Spain
In Barcelona, there is an abandoned underground mall near Plaça de Catalunya called Avinguda de la Llum, closed since 1990, which had originally been part of a more ambitious project to build an underground city under the centre of Barcelona. Also, some Metro stations or connecting lines in the same station are connected by underground passages over a block in length.
Legend has that the many caves and tunnels in Subterranean Toledo under the old part of Toledo were connected and were used by occultists.

Sweden
By walking through Stockholm subway stations and indoor shopping malls it is possible to walk indoor through the central business district, partly underground, from Arsenalsgatan subway entrance (Kungsträdgården station) to Kungsbron (north entrance to Cityterminalen bus terminal), covering a distance of between 1 and 2 kilometres.

Switzerland
Geneva contains a large underground shopping centre which also acts to connect separate sections of surface shops.
St. Gallen's main hospital uses several tunnels to connect its buildings, helicopter pad, pharmacies and storage facilities.
Zürich Hauptbahnhof in Zürich has an underground RailCity shopping mall with full access to the station platforms.

Taiwan

Taipei has underground streets connecting two or more metro stations. In addition, there is a large underground shopping mall near the main train station.
Underground streets around Taipei Station: Taipei City Mall, Eslite underground malls, Zhongshan Metro Mall, etc.
East Metro Mall, site between Zhongxiao Fuxing and Zhongxiao Dunhua metro stations.

Turkey
Cappadocia contains several historical underground cities carved out of unusual geological formations formed via the eruptions of ancient volcanoes. The cities were initially inhabited by the Hittites, then later by early Christians as hiding places. They are now archeological and tourist sites but are not generally occupied (see Kaymakli Underground City, Derinkuyu underground city, Özkonak Underground City, Mazı Underground City). The latest large underground city was discovered in 2007 in Gaziemir, Güzelyurt. It was a stopover on the Silk Road, allowing travelers and their camels to rest in safety underground, in a 'fortress' equivalent to a modern hotel.

Istanbul boasts the Roman cisterns, built 2,000 years ago for water storage it is now a tourist attraction.

Ukraine
Kyiv: An underground concourse extends underneath Khreschatyk Street from Maidan Nezalezhnosti to Ploscha L'va Tolstoho. The concourse connects to the Kyiv Metro and to the Globe shopping mall beneath Maidan Nezalezhnosti.
Odessa: A ramified tunnel network made from the former quarries that is famous as Odessa Catacombs covers the historical center of Odessa and some suburban areas.

United Kingdom
Corsham, Wiltshire, is the location of the Central Government War Headquarters, code name 'Burlington'. Built in the late 1950s in response to the increasing threat of nuclear warfare during the Cold War, the  subterranean site was designed to be the main emergency government war headquarters of the UK outside London and safely house up to 4,000 central government personnel in the event of a nuclear strike.
In London's redeveloped docklands Canary Wharf tube station, adjacent office towers and shopping malls are connected underground. It is also possible to access two stations of the Docklands Light Railway without going outside.
Dover contains a series of interconnecting tunnels, that honeycomb both sides of the Dover Valley, carved into the chalk cliffs. These date from Ancient times at Dover Castle through to Napoleonic, Second and Cold War installations. The Dover Castle complex is the larger, going at least six levels deep and includes a hospital, troops quarters, offices and storage and channel view points. The southern tunnels are mixed between Napoleonic War-era defences (see Dover Western Heights) and Second World War-era defences, with some seafront air raid shelters still used for shop storage today. Many have fallen into disrepair and are now closed to the public, but many are still open.
London: There are extensive rooms, tunnels and chambers known as Churchill War Rooms or Admiralty Citadel beneath Whitehall, created during World War II, and used by Winston Churchill.
There are extensive underground constructions across Britain, such as Chislehurst Caves, built or repurposed as air-raid shelters during World War II.
Edinburgh's old town has extensive rooms, tunnels and chambers beneath some areas; of particular note are the Edinburgh Vaults, where overcrowding led people to construct elaborately interconnected buildings in the vaults of the city's South Bridge.
In Southport, Merseyside, Nevill Street has the remainders of an underground shopping street, which can now only be accessed from the cellars of buildings on the current street, which was raised by one storey from the original level. One end of the underground street ended at the Marine Lake, close to the pier entrance.
In Liverpool, the Williamson's tunnels included the site of an 'underground house' complete with windows (concealed by work for public opening) and an extant and partially excavated 'banqueting hall'.
Nottingham has an extensive network of man-made caves, dating back to the Early Middle Ages.

United States

Albany, New York: The Empire State Plaza features an underground city which contains banks, a YMCA, restaurants, several food courts, retailers, a police station, a bus station, and a Visitor's Center. The Plaza connects several government buildings to the Egg (a state-owned theater), the New York State Museum, the New York State Library, the Corning Tower, legislative offices, judicial offices, and the Times Union Center. The Empire State Plaza Art Collection consists of 92 large-scale paintings, sculptures, and tapestries at various locations along the main corridor, and features works from the New York School of abstract modern art from the 1960s and 1970s.
Atlanta, Georgia: The "Underground" represents the original surface level of downtown Atlanta; the present streets are raised roadways (viaducts) built in the 1920s. The shopping center Underground Atlanta, taking advantage of the former street-level storefronts, covers six city blocks and includes retail shopping and restaurants. It was begun in 1968 and re-opened in 1989 after a financially forced closure.
Boise, Idaho: The downtown sector's Capitol Mall Complex consists of a large system of networked tunnels that connect all the state buildings. The tunnels have walkways and vehicle passageways. The underground area boasts a geothermal power plant, a banking system, extensive dining areas, parking, a dedicated mail room for the Capitol Mall Complex and a fallout shelter. The main hall is decorated with art from local artists that was collected over a thirty-year time frame. This collection is not often seen by the public as access is limited. Recent remodeling of the Idaho State Capitol Building has added new underground wings that are linked to the Capitol Mall. These new wings have offices, meeting rooms, and records storage areas and were designed to support the Idaho legislature when it is in session.
Boston, Massachusetts:  Northeastern University has a tunnel network linking thirteen buildings in the center of campus.
Cambridge, Massachusetts: Many of the older buildings of the Massachusetts Institute of Technology between Massachusetts Avenue and Ames Street are linked together by underground utility tunnels.
Chicago, Illinois: The Chicago Pedway consists of approximately 4 disjointed tunnel systems, the largest covering about 10 blocks, connecting such buildings and transit stations as Metra's Millennium Station, the Chicago Cultural Center, the Macy's (former Marshall Field's) store at State and Randolph, Chicago Transit Authority's State Street and Dearborn Street subway stations, City Hall, and the James R. Thompson Center, along with few residential buildings including Aqua, Columbus Plaza, The Heritage at Millennium Park, the Park Millennium and 200 North Dearborn Apartments.
Cleveland, Ohio: The Tower City Center, on the public square at the center of downtown Cleveland, houses a shopping mall with a food court, two hotels, and the Tower City Rapid Transit Station, the central station on RTA's Red, Green, and Blue Lines. The building connects to several office buildings, and also has an enclosed skyway to the Gateway Sports and Entertainment Complex.
Crystal City, Virginia: A residential and commercial area of Arlington County, Virginia next to the Ronald Reagan Washington National Airport, Crystal City features an extensive underground city connecting its hotels, office buildings, and apartment towers and is lined with 173 shops, restaurants, banks, medical, and other services.
Dallas, Texas: The Dallas Pedestrian Network has a network of tunnels connecting buildings in the downtown area.
Dayton, Ohio: The academic section of Wright State University's campus contains nearly two miles (3.18 kilometers) of tunnels  that link 20 of the 22 buildings. The tunnels were designed to connect the campus without imprinting the surrounding land.
Detroit, Michigan: The Fisher Building, located in New Center, features an underground concourse which connects with the Albert Kahn Building, New Center One, and Cadillac Place (formerly the General Motors Building) via a series of skyways and tunnels.
Duluth, Minnesota: The city's downtown sector has an extensive network of skyways and tunnels connecting its buildings, including the Federal Courthouse and Convention Center (DECC).
Havre, Montana: The city has an underground area, called "Havre Beneath the Streets", that operates as a tourist attraction.
Houston, Texas: The seven-mile (11 km) Houston tunnel system is set about twenty feet below Houston's downtown street system and is composed of underground passageways which, with above-ground skywalks, link office towers to hotels, banks, corporate and government offices, restaurants, retail stores, and the Houston Theater District. Only one building, Wells Fargo Plaza, offers direct access from the street to the Tunnel; otherwise, the Tunnel can only be entered via street-level stairs, escalators, or elevators inside a building connected to it.
Irvine, California: A network of large tunnels running beneath the University of California, Irvine connects many of the campus' major buildings to a central utility plant.  These tunnels are only accessible to maintenance staff, although there are also publicly accessible tunnels which intersect the utility tunnels, such as the one that goes between the main Information & Computer Science building and the Engineering Tower.
Kansas City, Missouri: The city's SubTropolis is a 55,000,000 square foot (5,060,000 m³), 1,100-acre (4.5 km²) underground business complex running along the Missouri River. The space was originally part of the Bethany Falls limestone mine, and was later repurposed for use as a commercial underground storage facility.
Minneapolis and Saint Paul, Minnesota: There are three major systems consisting mostly of above-ground skyways in the Twin Cities. The Minneapolis Skyway System covers approximately 11 miles with 62 skyways. St. Paul's skyway system connects buildings in a 30-block radius in the downtown core. On the University of Minnesota Minneapolis and St Paul campuses, the Gopher Way connects most buildings and parking structures together using a number of skyway links and tunnels. A system of tunnels connects state office buildings around the Minnesota State Capitol. A series of tunnels also connect the Hennepin County Government Center, Minneapolis City Hall, and the United States District Court for the District of Minnesota.
New York City, New York: Several New York City Subway stations have direct access to one or more buildings. Additionally, most of the lower floor of the Rockefeller Center qualifies as an underground city, as it features connections to subways, an extensive underground concourse, building connections, and several restaurants, all below ground. The area around Times Square and the Port Authority Bus Terminal forms an underground network several blocks in size; much of it is within the Subway's fare control. A series of tunnels connect Brookfield Place (New York City) through the World Trade Center's lower levels, to the Fulton Center, forming an underground city with several subway stations and many shops and restaurants.
Oklahoma City, Oklahoma: The Oklahoma City Underground (formerly the Oklahoma City Conncourse) is a tunnel system connecting nearly all of the downtown buildings in a 20-square-block area. It is one of the most extensive all-enclosed pedestrian systems in the U.S., extending three-quarters of a mile and connecting over 30 downtown buildings via tunnels or skyways. The original tunnel link was built in 1931 and the system was extended in the 1970s. It underwent a $2 million renovation in 2006–2007, after which the Conncourse was renamed the Underground.
Philadelphia, Pennsylvania: Center City has several miles of interconnected underground concourses under Market, Broad, and Locust Streets, and JFK Boulevard. The system includes nine rapid transit and regional rail stations served by 23 SEPTA and PATCO lines, and the lower levels of several shopping centers. It is also connected to the lower levels of many office buildings and several department stores and hotels, as well as the customer service counters of the Municipal Services Building. A branch of the US Post Office is located in the Suburban Station section of the concourse.
Richmond, Virginia: There are a series of connected tunnels between state government buildings in the city of Richmond. Certain passageways are locked off but a good portion of the tunnels are accessible from buildings. The purpose of the tunnels is not generally known; the two most common explanations are that they were built to allow people to move between buildings in inclement weather or that they were built as part of an emergency evacuation plan.
Rochester, Minnesota: The Mayo Clinic's buildings in the downtown area are interconnected with tunnels and skyways. Other businesses are along the corridors, including a number of hotels that often house clinic patients. It is often called a subway, although there are no underground rails in the city.
Rochester, New York: Nazareth College in the southeast portion of Rochester has an extensive underground network of tunnels leading from the dormitories to the major buildings on campus. Rochester Institute of Technology has several underground networks connecting dormitories and academic buildings together. The University of Rochester has an underground network connecting many of its academic buildings.
Seattle, Washington: Several modern undergrounds and a historical tour exist. The Westlake Center shopping mall and its surrounding department stores have underground entrances to the mezzanine level of the Westlake light rail station in the Downtown Seattle Transit Tunnel. Another substantial corridor extends from Two Union Square to Rainier Square, with connections to hotels, the 5th Avenue Theatre, and many retail shops along the way. The Seattle Underground Tour in Pioneer Square takes visitors on a humorous guided walk showing the original ground level of many buildings in that area.

Vicksburg, Mississippi: During the Siege of Vicksburg in 1863, Union gunboats lobbed over 22,000 shells into the town, destroying nearly all of the town's housing. As a result, over 500 caves were dug into the clay hills surrounding Vicksburg. The Union soldiers later gave the town the nickname of "Prairie Dog Village" due to these caves.
Walt Disney World, Florida (southwest of Orlando, Florida) has a network of utility tunnels used by its employees for transportation between venues, rest areas, staff preparation, and first aid. The main system is under the Magic Kingdom theme park. Other tunnels lie underneath Future World at Epcot.
Washington D.C.: All of the buildings in the United States Capitol Complex are connected by tunnels and underground walkways, which provide easy passage between legislative office buildings, the Capitol, the Capitol Visitor Center, and the Library of Congress in inclement weather. The tunnels connecting office buildings are open to the public, but those connecting to the Capitol require security clearance to use. Small electric tramways run from the Capitol building to the Russell, Dirksen, and Hart Senate Office Buildings and to the Rayburn House Office Building. The tunnel between the Capitol and the Cannon House Office Building displays winning pieces of artwork from the annual Congressional Art Competition for high school students.
Wellesley, Massachusetts: There is an underground network connecting several buildings at Wellesley College.

See also

Other parent categories from the same field:
Rock-cut architecture
Subterranea (geography): underground structures
Underground living
Underground construction

Types of underground spaces and people, and related topics:
Ant tribe – Chinese sociology term
Rat tribe
Arcology – ecological architecture term
Catacombs
Cities of the Underworld documentary television series
Mole people – homeless tunnel dwellers
Pedway – elevated or underground walkways
Rapid transit (subway)
Secret passage
Tunnels in popular culture
Skyway
Utility tunnel

References

 
Pedestrian infrastructure
Urban exploration